Saniya Shaikh (born 25 April 1992) is an international shooter, representing India in Women Skeet (SK75) (SK125) event in International Shooting Sport Federation.

Family
Sanya is the 3rd generation shooter in the family, starting with her grandfather Lt. Mohammed Mateen Shaikh who was a hunter in early days, her father Mohammed Sualeyheen Sheikh, who also acts as her coach. Saniya's brother Hamaza Shaikh is also a shooter, her cousins are also international shooters Mohammed Saif Sheikh and Mohammed Sheeraz Sheikh.

Together, the family has even created their own Gun house, known as "Mateen Gun House" in the town of Meerut.

Achievements 

She has won a number of events for the country, however didn't qualify for Asian Olympic.

See also
Heena Sidhu

References 

1992 births
Living people
Sport shooters from Uttar Pradesh
Indian female sport shooters
Sportspeople from Meerut